Bombo is a 2013 song performed by Norwegian singer Adelén. It was one of the finalists of Melodi Grand Prix 2013 in a bid to represent Norway in the Eurovision Song Contest 2013 in Malmö, Sweden. It has been described as a tropical dance song.

The song advanced to the Top 10 finals and was chosen as one of four songs for the Gold Final. It eventually finished runner-up, the winner being Margaret Berger and her song "I Feed You My Love". Despite "Bombo" not winning the final nomination, it went straight to number 2 on the Norwegian iTunes chart after her performance, reaching the top of the charts the week after.

It participated in the 2013 OGAE Second Chance Contest and won the competition with 151 points, 29 points over the runner-up, "E se poi" by Malika Ayane. 

The track also scored the 2013 Eurodanceweb Award reaching the highest score on the history of the Award as well as the largest distance from the second placed song.

"Bombo" was certified Gold in Sweden.

Charts

Certifications

References

2013 songs
Number-one singles in Norway
2013 singles
Songs written by Andreas Romdhane
Songs written by Josef Larossi
Songs written by Ina Wroldsen
Macaronic songs
Song recordings produced by Quiz & Larossi
Melodi Grand Prix songs of 2013